Heriberto Morales Jr. (born January 24, 1975) is an American attorney and politician. He has represented the 74th District in the Texas House of Representatives since 2021. He is a member of the Democratic Party.

Early life, education, and career
Born in Piedras Negras, Coahuila, Mexico in 1975, Morales graduated from Eagle Pass High School in Eagle Pass, Texas in 1993. He then went on an attended the University of Texas at Austin, where he received a BA in Political Science and a double minor in Business and Spanish in 1997. Eddie later earned his Juris Doctor from the St. Mary's University School of Law in 2000. Since then Eddie has worked for Langley & Bannack back in Eagle Pass. During his high school years, Eddie helped at his family's business, Piedras Negras Tortilla Factory in Eagle Pass, where he learned the value of hard work and effort and an appreciation for his community.

Elections
Morales announced in November 2019 to run for the Texas House of Representatives District 74th seat, that was being held by Poncho Nevárez at the time. Representative Nevárez announced in late 2019, that he would not seek re-election for the 87th legislature. Eddie won the 2020 election for the seat against Ruben Falcon (a Republican) with 53% of the vote in November 2020.

Political positions

Border
Eddie supports legal immigration, expanding worker visa permits and bracero-type visas for farming and agriculture. Also in favor of a controlled and secured border using a combination of manpower, advanced border security technology and a physical border.

Education
Morales is in favor of increasing funding for public schools for school safety and security.

Health care
Eddie supports expanding Medicaid, so that all receives quality and affordable healthcare. he states that six of the 12 counties have three or less physicians. Three counties within the district have zero physicians servicing their communities.

Transportation
Morales supports more funding in his district for transportation, as he believes roadway access between communities through a modernized roadway is essential for the safety of our citizens and the growth of communities. He states that cities and counties in the district cannot afford significant infrastructure investments.

References

External links
 Campaign website
 State legislative page

1975 births
American politicians of Mexican descent
Living people
Democratic Party members of the Texas House of Representatives
21st-century American politicians
Hispanic and Latino American state legislators in Texas
University of Texas at Austin alumni
St. Mary's University School of Law alumni
People from Eagle Pass, Texas
American lawyers
Texas lawyers
People from Piedras Negras, Coahuila